Shujauddin (born 16 February 1970) is a former Pakistani cricketer. From Quetta, the capital of Balochistan province, all of his matches at a major level came during the 1998–99 season of the limited-overs Tissot Cup. Shujauddin made his debut for Quetta against Hyderabad in April 1999, scoring 22 not out on debut, in what was to be his highest score in List A matches. A wicket-keeper, he played three further matches during the competition, but was replaced by Sanaullah Khan for the final fixture against the Pakistan National Shipping Corporation. Overall, Shujauddin scored 45 runs and made seven dismissals (five catches and two stumpings) from his four matches in the competition.

References

1970 births
Living people
Pakistani cricketers
Cricketers from Quetta
Quetta cricketers
Wicket-keepers